Lojze Slak (23 July 1932 – 29 September 2011) was a Slovenian musician. Slak was one of the pioneers of Slovene popular folk music, based on diatonic button accordion and author of several evergreen songs, performed by his Lojzeta Slaka Ansamble.

Early life and career
Slak was born in Jordankal near Mirna Peč. He first learned how to play the diatonic button accordion from his uncle Ludvik and mastered several songs before he entered primary school. By the time he was 15, Slak was already playing at wedding parties. He continued playing for more than ten years, gaining proficiency. The turning point in his career came in 1957, when he competed in a radio talent show "Pokaži kaj znaš". Two years later Slak formed a quartet with his three brothers, playing a trumpet, a clarinet, a bass and the accordion by Lojze.

Lojze Slak Ensemble
In 1964, Slak met the group Fantje s Praprotna and together they formed the Lojze Slak Ansamble (Ansambel Lojzeta Slaka). The group was active for almost 50 years, creating several evergreen songs, including Čez Gorjance (1965), V dolini tihi je vasica mala (1966), Po dekle (1967) and Mama, prihajam domov (1985). Overall, Slak created more than 500 songs and created a branch of music with several hundreds of followers in Slovenia and abroad.

In 2005, Lojze Slak created an arrangement of a song by a rock group Big Foot Mama, creating a combination of popular folk and rock music, gaining praise from the audiences. Both groups performed the song together at several concerts, including at rock festivals.

In addition to writing music, Slak, a virtuoso on diatonic button accordion, developed several improvements for the instrument, adding extra buttons. He was also a promoter of cviček wine, and had his own vineyard.

Slak died in 2011 in Ljubljana after fighting bone cancer. He was buried in Šentvid.

References

External links
 Official web page

1932 births
2011 deaths
Slovenian musicians
Deaths from bone cancer
Slovenian accordionists
Deaths from cancer in Slovenia
Slovenian composers
Male composers
People from the Municipality of Mirna Peč
Slovenian male musicians